The Swedish men's national inline hockey team is one of the most successful inline hockey teams in the world. With notable alumni like Henrik Lundqvist the Swedes have won five gold medals as members of the Top Division at the IIHF Inline Hockey World Championships.

2008 World Championship roster

References
http://reports.iihf.hockey/Hydra/134/IHM1340SWE_33_2_0.pdf

Inline hockey in Sweden
National inline hockey teams
Inline hockey
Men's sport in Sweden